The Republic of Kazakhstan has a two-tier banking system.

Tier One Bank
The National Bank of the Republic of Kazakhstan is the central bank of Kazakhstan and presents the upper (first) tier of the banking system of Kazakhstan. The National Bank represents, within the limits of its authority, the interests of the Republic of Kazakhstan in the relationship with the central banks, with banks of other countries, in the international banks and other financial-credit organizations.

Second-tier banks
All banks operating in the country, except the National Bank of Kazakhstan, represent the second tier of the banking system and are second-tier banks. The legal basis for operation of the second-tier banks is the law «On Banks and Banking in the Republic of Kazakhstan» from August 31, 1995, № 2443. According to this law, a second-tier bank in Kazakhstan is a corporate entity which, irrespective of the form of ownership, carries on business for achieving its main goal of earning profits. Second-tier banks are entitled to open their subsidiary banks, branch and representative offices on the territory of Kazakhstan as well as outside of the territory of the country. Banks on April 13, 2022 there are 22 (10 of them are with foreign capital, the share of which is only 17.1%).

Development Bank of Kazakhstan 
Development Bank of Kazakhstan JSC operates as a national development institution in the Republic of Kazakhstan. The company’s services include investment projects funding, export operations financing, interbank lending, clients operational servicing, and lease financing. It also offers various financial services, such as mezzanine, syndicated, interim, lease transactions, and project financing; lending of current activities; and provision of guarantees, as well as equity and capital participation.

Deposit Guarantee System 
Kazakhstan Deposit Insurance Fund (the KDIF) was established by Resolution of the National Bank of the Republic of Kazakhstan Management Board No. 393 dated 15 November 1999 “On incorporation of «Kazakhstan Individuals’ Deposit Guarantee (Insurance) Fund».

Individuals’ deposits placed in the second-tier banks of the Republic of Kazakhstan, excluding  non-interest bearing demand deposits placed with the Islamic banks.
 Deposits in tenge are insured up to 10 million tenge per depositor per bank
 Deposits in foreign currency are insured up to 5 million tenge per depositor per bank (in equivalent, foreign exchange rate applied as of the date of effect of the court ruling regarding forced liquidation of a deposit insurance system member bank)

At present the Parliament of the Republic of Kazakhstan has approved the draft law which stipulates deposit coverage payouts on the individuals’ and individual entrepreneurs’ savings deposits up to the deposit coverage limit of 15 million tenge.

Population deposits 
In August 2018 the number of deposits of individuals has reached the historic peak - 8.3 trillion tenges, 47% of the total volume of deposits.

References

External links 
 

 01
Economy of Kazakhstan-related lists
.
Kazakhstan
Kazakhstan
Kazakhstan
Banks